Nallabelly or Nallabelli is a village and a mandal in Warangal district in the state of Telangana in India.

Villages 

Arshanpalle
Arvaiahpally
Asaravelli
Govindapur
Gundlapahad
Kannaraopet
Kondapur
Lenkalpalle
Medapalle
Muchimpula
Nagrajpalle
Nallabelly
Nandigama
Narakkapet
Rampur
Ramteertham
Rangapuram
Relakunta
Rudragudem
Shanigaram

References 
 villageinfo.in

Villages in Warangal district
Mandals in Warangal district